Thomas Leon White (born October 4, 1963) is a former American football linebacker.

NFL career
White played eight seasons in the National Football League. Starting OLB for the Cincinnati Bengals in Super Bowl 23.

College career
He played college football for four years at Brigham Young University and was on the unbeaten 1984 National Championship team. 1984 Holiday Bowl Defensive MVP.

High school career
White prepped at Helix High School in La Mesa, California. Helped Helix win two CIF San Diego section football championships. (1978,1980)

References

1963 births
Living people
Players of American football from San Diego
American football linebackers
BYU Cougars football players
Cincinnati Bengals players
Los Angeles Rams players